AIP Advances is an open-access peer-reviewed scientific mega journal published by the American Institute of Physics. It was established in March 2011. It covers all aspects of physics, both experimental and theoretical.

Submissions are peer-reviewed to assess accuracy and originality, while impact, timeliness, and interest are judged a posteriori through online discussion and ranking tools. All articles are published under a Creative Commons License, with the author retaining the copyright and paying a publication fee.

The deputy editors are Javier E. Garay (University of California San Diego), A. T. Charlie Johnson (University of Pennsylvania), Ben Slater (University College London), Masaaki Tanaka (University of Tokyo), and Enge G. Wang (Peking University). The journal is abstracted and indexed by the Science Citation Index Expanded and Current Contents/Physical, Chemical & Earth Sciences. According to the Journal Citation Reports, the journal has a 2021 impact factor of 1.697.

References

External links 
 

Physics journals
English-language journals
American Institute of Physics academic journals
Creative Commons Attribution-licensed journals
Publications established in 2011
Continuous journals